Events from the year 2013 in Algeria:

Incumbents
 President: Abdelaziz Bouteflika
 Prime Minister: Abdelmalek Sellal

Events
16–19 January –  Al-Qaeda-linked terrorists take over 800 people hostage at the Tigantourine gas facility near "In Amenas" in the In Amenas hostage crisis.
 16–30 March – 2013 African U-20 Championship, the 19th African Youth Championship  was held in Algeria, with Egypt winning, and going on to the 2013 FIFA U-20 World Cup.
 5 December – High-level Al-Qaeda leader, Khalil Ould Addah, is killed by the Algerian Army. He had been coming from Mali to a meeting with other al-Qaeda leaders.

Deaths
 5 November – Abdou Nef, 18, footballer (born 1995)
 5 December – Khalil Ould Addah, high-level Al-Qaeda leader

See also

References

External links
 

 
Years of the 21st century in Algeria